The Gallows is a 2015 American found footage supernatural horror film written and directed by Chris Lofing and Travis Cluff. The film stars Reese Mishler, Pfeifer Brown, Ryan Shoos and Cassidy Gifford.

The Gallows was released in the United States by Warner Bros. Pictures and New Line Cinema on July 10, 2015. It was largely disliked by critics and audiences but grossed $43 million worldwide against a $100,000 budget. A sequel, The Gallows Act II, was released in October 2019.

Plot
On October 29, 1993, Beatrice High School student Charlie Grimille is accidentally hung and killed after a prop malfunction during a presentation of the play The Gallows. His parents, along with the whole audience, witness the tragic event.

Twenty years later, on October 28, 2013, the school attempts to put on a new performance of The Gallows. Reese Houser is excited, as this gives him a chance to grow closer to his crush Pfeifer Ross. His friend Ryan Shoos comes up with the idea to vandalize the set. That night, Reese, Ryan, and Ryan's girlfriend Cassidy Spilker sneak into the school and begin to dismantle the set, only to hear Pfeifer in the hallway. They try to leave but find that they have been locked inside, and there is no cell phone reception. Disturbed, Cassidy admits the trio's real reason for being in the school at this time, which angers Pfeifer.

The group see the set reassembled and find news coverage of Charlie's death that includes an interview with his girlfriend Alexis. They discover that Charlie was not supposed to have performed that day, and was only on stage because he was the understudy for the main actor, Reese's father Rick. The group becomes separated. Alone, Ryan sees various things, such as a hidden room with a mattress and bed frame, and a body hanging. When the group is reunited, Cassidy is yanked into the air by seemingly nothing, leaving her with burns on her neck that look like rope burns.

They return to the stage, where Pfeifer points out an air conditioning duct they can escape through. Ryan is thrown off the ladder by an unseen force, and his leg is broken. The group becomes locked out of the stage where Ryan lies helpless. They eventually get back, finding only Ryan's phone. The audience then sees footage from the phone.

Ryan sees a figure holding a noose. He is then pulled away by the neck by a fly rig. As the night progresses, Cassidy is killed by Charlie dressed as the Hangman, a character from The Gallows. Reese and Pfeifer end up on the stage, where the spirit begins to choke her. Realizing Charlie wants them to act out the final scene (in which Reese and Charlie's characters are hung), Reese and Pfeifer reenact the scene. However, when Reese puts the noose around his neck, he is hung and killed by Charlie. Once he is dead, Pfeifer and Charlie, now appearing as an adult, both bow, and Alexis, who was watching the performance, gives a standing ovation.

The police enter the house where Pfeifer and Alexis are living and watching footage of Charlie's death, showing that Pfeifer is the daughter of Charlie and Alexis. When they attempt to question them about Charlie, Pfeifer warns, "You shouldn’t say that name". The officer witnesses his partner being dragged by a noose, killing him. Charlie then attacks and kills the policeman, as the screen cuts to black.

Cast
 Reese Mishler as Reese Houser
 Pfeifer Brown as Pfeifer Ross
 Ryan Shoos as Ryan Shoos
 Cassidy Gifford as Cassidy Spilker
 Price T. Morgan as Price
 Jesse Cross as Charlie Grimille (1993)
 Melissa Bratton as Alexis Ross (2013)
 Alexis Schneider as Alexis Ross / Mary (1993)
 Theo Burkhardt as Rick Houser (2013)
 John Tanskly as Rick Houser (1993)
 Emily Jones as Ryan's mother
 Travis Cluff as Mr. Schwendiman
 Mackie Burt as Cheerleader
 Ariel Castro as Charlie Grimille (2013)

Production
On June 24, 2014, New Line Cinema acquired distribution rights to the film. On December 10, 2014, it was announced the film would be released on July 10, 2015, in the United States. Though the film is set in Lofing's hometown of Beatrice, Nebraska, all of the scenes in the theatrical version of the film were shot in Fresno, California. Several scenes in the first cut of the film were shot in Beatrice, but those scenes were dropped when Blumhouse Productions picked up the film. Those scenes were featured in the DVD and Blu-ray releases of The Gallows. The actors performed their own stunts, and no major CGI was used in the film, Lofing said.

Release

Box office 
The Gallows grossed $22.7 million in North America and $20.2 million in other territories for a worldwide total of $43 million, against a budget of $100,000.

The Gallows opened on July 10, 2015, simultaneously with animated film Minions and the sci-fi drama Self/less. The film grossed $900,000 during its Thursday night showings, and $4.5 million on its opening day. The film opened at number five at the box office in its opening weekend, with $9.8 million.

Critical response
On Rotten Tomatoes, 14% of critics have given the film a positive review based on 119 reviews, with an average rating of 3.40/10. The site's critics consensus reads, "Narratively contrived and visually a mess, The Gallows sends viewers on a shaky tumble to the bottom of the found-footage horror barrel." On Metacritic, the film has a weighted average score of 30 out of 100 based on reviews from 22 critics, indicating "generally unfavorable reviews". Audiences polled by CinemaScore gave the film a grade of "C" on an A+ to F scale.

Geoff Berkshire of Variety gave the film a negative review, saying "The Gallows isn't without a certain amount of atmosphere, [but] simply feels borrowed wholesale. That would matter less with a better script, but the four main characters are paper-thin even by genre norms." Stephen Whitty of the Newark Star-Ledger gave the film one out of four stars, saying "The plot is a collection of contrivances (Oh no, the lights all went out! My cell phone won't work! I'm running for my life, I'd better keep filming!) and the scares are simple, sudden, stupid shocks." Kyle Anderson of Entertainment Weekly gave the film a C, saying "This is another found-footage movie that, with a little art direction and some actual cinematography, could easily have been a decent little terrorizer. Instead, it comes mostly unglued thanks to its hacky gimmick." Bruce Demara of the Toronto Star gave the film two out of four stars, saying "Despite its initial promise and some decent scares - you're in for a sharp and sudden drop in satisfaction in the final throes." Mick LaSalle of the San Francisco Chronicle gave the film two out of four stars, saying "The filmmakers needed to set themselves free even more than the characters, but they never find the path out. They probably never realized they were trapped."

Simon Abrams of The Village Voice gave the film a negative review, saying "The Gallows is only good enough to make you wish its creators did something novel with its formulaic style, plot, and characterizations." Neil Genzlinger of The New York Times said, "The Gallows starts with a decent if improbable premise, and it ends with a pretty good jolt. But in between, the film sure wears out the already tired found-footage device." Tirdad Derakhshani of The Philadelphia Inquirer gave the film a negative review, saying "The Gallows is one lazy film. There's no real effort or inventiveness here, whether we're talking about the character names, the jokes, the set pieces, or the predictable plot twist." Richard Roeper of the Chicago Sun-Times gave the film three out of four stars, saying "In a quick 80 minutes, we get the back story, we meet the four core characters (all of the young actors do fine work), get the wits scared out of us about a half-dozen times and wind up with a VERY creepy ending." Barry Hertz of The Globe and Mail gave the film one out of four stars, saying "As the latest entry in the tired "found footage" horror subgenre, this on-the-cheap film has never met a cliché it didn't embrace like sweet death itself." A.A. Dowd of The A.V. Club gave the film a D+, saying "Making audiences care about the characters is always a more effective fear-generating strategy than just knocking off a bunch of dimwits in the dark."

Sequel

In August 2017, it was announced that The Gallows Act II was filmed secretly. The film was released on October 25, 2019 in theaters, on demand and digital by Lionsgate.

References

External links
 

2015 films
2015 horror films
2010s ghost films
2010s teen horror films
American ghost films
American supernatural horror films
American teen horror films
Blumhouse Productions films
Dune Entertainment films
Films produced by Jason Blum
Films set in 1993
Films set in 2013
Films set in Nebraska
Films shot in California
Found footage films
New Line Cinema films
Warner Bros. films
2015 directorial debut films
2010s English-language films
2010s American films